The 1876 United States presidential election in Texas was held on November 7, 1876, as part of the 1876 United States presidential election. State voters chose eight electors to represent the state in the Electoral College, which chose the president and vice president.

Texas overwhelmingly voted for the Democratic nominee, Governor Samuel J. Tilden of New York, who received 70% of the vote. With 70% of the popular vote, the Lone Star State proved to be Tilden's second-strongest state only after Georgia.

Results

See also
 United States presidential elections in Texas

References

1876
Texas
1876 Texas elections